The Kanakadhara Stotram is a Hindu hymn (stotram) composed in Sanskrit by the theologian Adi Shankara.

Etymology 
 means "the stream of gold", and the hymn is called by this name since legend has it that when Adi Shankara recited it, the goddess Lakshmi showered a stream of gold within the hut of his poor Brahmin benefactor.

Description

The hymn was written in the 8th century CE by Adi Shankara, a revered Hindu philosopher. 

According to tradition, as a young boy, Adi Shankara was out seeking alms to prepare his lunch and happened upon the doorstep of a very poor Brahmin woman. Having nothing edible in her home, the lady frantically searched her house, only to find a single gooseberry fruit, which she then hesitantly offered to Shankara. Shankara was so moved by the incredible selflessness of this woman that he burst forth into poetry and sang 22 stanzas in praise of the goddess Lakshmi. Pleased by the beauty of the hymn, the goddess instantly showered the lady's house with gooseberries made of pure gold.

Hymn 
The first hymn of the Kanakadhara Stotram is as follows:

References

External links 
Kanakadhara Storam, translated by P. R. Ramachander
Learn Sri Kanakadhara Stotram

Hindu texts
Hymns
Adi Shankara
Advaita Vedanta texts